Joshua Andrew Harrop (born 15 December 1995) is an English professional footballer who plays as a midfielder for Northampton Town. He began his career with Manchester United but failed to break into the first team and left for Preston in July 2017. He was released from the club in September 2022.

Club career

Manchester United
Harrop marked his senior debut with a goal for United against Crystal Palace on the last day of the 2016–17 Premier League season, the first of a 2–0 win. His goal made him Manchester United's 100th different scorer in the Premier League. After finishing the season as the under-23 side's top scorer with 10 goals, Harrop rejected a contract offer from the club in June 2017.

Preston North End
On 23 June 2017, Preston North End announced Harrop would join on 3 July, signing a four-year contract for an undisclosed compensation agreement. On 29 September 2018, during a 3–2 loss to West Bromwich Albion, Harrop suffered an anterior cruciate ligament injury, which kept him out for the rest of the season. He made his return in August 2019, coming off the bench to score in a 4–0 win over Bradford City in the first round of the 2019–20 EFL Cup. He also scored in his next two matches, a 3–1 home win over Stoke City in the league and a 2–2 draw at home to Hull City in the second round of the EFL Cup, in which he also provided an assist and scored in the subsequent penalty shoot-out.

In January 2021, Harrop joined League One club Ipswich Town on loan. Harrop made 15 appearances during his loan spell at Ipswich.

On 27 January 2022, Harrop joined League One side Fleetwood Town on loan until the end of the 2021–22 season.

Harrop was placed on the transfer list on 7 May 2022 at the conclusion of the 2021–22 season. On 1 September 2022, Harrop had his contract terminated by mutual consent.

Northampton Town
On 12 December 2022, Harrop joined League Two side Northampton Town on a short-term contract.

International career
Harrop received his first call up to the England U20 squad in September 2014. He won three caps for the under-20s in 2014.

Career statistics

References

External links
 
England profile at The Football Association

1995 births
Living people
Footballers from Stockport
English footballers
England youth international footballers
Association football midfielders
Manchester United F.C. players
Preston North End F.C. players
Ipswich Town F.C. players
Fleetwood Town F.C. players
Northampton Town F.C. players
Premier League players
English Football League players